The Washington T-411 Wolverine is an American homebuilt aircraft that was produced by Washington Aeroprogress of Seattle, Washington, introduced in the 1990s. When it was available the aircraft was supplied as a kit or in the form of plans for amateur construction.

Design and development
Developed from the Russian Khrunichev T-411 Aist, the T-411 Wolverine features a strut-braced high-wing, a five-seat enclosed cabin with doors, fixed conventional landing gear with wheel pants and a single engine in tractor configuration.

Like its Russian predecessor the T-411 Wolverine was designed for operations from unprepared surfaces.

The aircraft is made from a mix of steel and aluminum, covered in doped aircraft fabric. The aircraft includes provisions for floats and skis.

The manufacturer estimated the construction time from the supplied kit as 1000 hours.

Operational history
By 1998 the company reported that 10 kits had been sold and were completed and flying.

In May 2014 two examples were registered in the United States with the Federal Aviation Administration, although a total of three had been registered at one time.

Specifications (T-411 Wolverine)

References

External links
 Photo of a Washington T-411 Wolverine

T-411
1990s United States sport aircraft
1990s United States civil utility aircraft
Single-engined tractor aircraft
High-wing aircraft
Homebuilt aircraft